

PJSC «Ukrhydroenergo» is a state company of Ukraine that administers a cascade of major hydro power plants along Dnieper and Dniester rivers. Private Joint Stock Company «Ukrhydroenergo» is Ukraine's main hydropower generating company. It is capable of covering peak loads and providing FCAS for the United Energy Systems of Ukraine (UESU). The company generates electricity at the industry's lowest production cost per kWatt. Hydroelectricity is a renewable energy source, and does not require the combustion of fossil fuels in its operation. 
The Company operates powerful HPPs and PSPs, develops the domestic hydropower industry, and makes an important contribution to the energy security and independence of Ukraine. Ukrhydroenergo's HPPs and PSPs are modern energy generating facilities that are not only the hallmarks in their satellite cities and towns, but also the infrastructural pride of the Ukrainian power industry. The company operates ten power plants on the Dnieper and Dniester rivers: Kyivska HPP, Kyivska PSP, Kanivska HPP, Kremenchutska HPP, Seredniodniprovska HPP, Dniprovska HPP No. 1, Dniprovska HPP No. 2, Kakhovska HPP, Dnistrovska HPP, and Dnistrovska PSP. Enabling works are underway at Kanivska PSP and Kakhovska HPP No. 2.

Company Growth Milestones

1994 
The Ministry of Energy and Electrification of Ukraine issued Order No. 288 dated 27 December 1994, “On the Establishment of State Enterprise “Dniprohydroenergo”. The company evolved from structural units, Dniprovska HPP, Dniprodzerzhinska HPP, Cascade of Seredniodniprovska HPPs, Kakhovska HPP, and Kremenchutska HPP, and was their successor. Semen Potashnyk was appointed acting Director of Dniprohydroenergo.

1995 
On 7 July 1995, the Ministry of Energy and Electrification of Ukraine issued Order No. 120 “On the Establishment of State Joint-Stock Hydropower Generating Company “Dniprohydroenergo” to approve a valuation statement for the integral property complex of State Enterprise “Dniprohydroenergo”. State Joint-Stock Hydropower Generating Company “Dniprohydroenergo” evolved from State Enterprise “Dniprohydroenergo”. Semen Potashnyk was appointed the Board Chairman of State Joint-Stock Hydropower Generating Company “Dniprohydroenergo”. Under the order, State Joint-Stock Hydropower Generating Company “Dniprohydroenergo” was the successor of State Enterprise “Dniprohydroenergo”, with 100% of the company's shares remaining in state ownership.

1997 
In 1997, the Ministry of Energy reorganised Cascade of Seredniodniprovska HPPs into standalone structural units: Cascade of Kyivska HPP and Kyivska PSP, and Kanivska HPP (Order No. 24 dd. 7 October 1997). The headcount and statutory capital remained unchanged. In accordance with its Charter, State Joint-Stock Hydropower Generating Company “Dniprohydroenergo” had the following structure: Cascade of Kyivska HPP and Kyivska PSP, Kanivska HPP, Kremenchutska HPP, Dniprodzerzhynska HPP, Dniprovska HPP, Kakhovska HPP. The company's Board decided to consolidate the management of Dniprohydroenergo and the Cascade of Kyivska HPP and Kyivska PSP.

2003 
On 31 December 2003, the Ministry of Fuel and Energy issued Order No. 831 to establish State Joint-Stock Company “Ukrhydroenergo”. On 10 February 2004, the ministry issued Order No. 84 to amend Order No. 881 and merge Dniprohydroenergo and Dnistrohydroenergo into State Joint-Stock Company “Ukrhydroenergo”.

2004 
In accordance with President's Decree No. 69 dd. 22 January 2004 “On Measures to Improve the Efficiency of Management of the Electricity Sector” and Resolution of the Cabinet of Ministers of Ukraine “On the Establishment of National Joint-Stock Company “Energy Company of Ukraine” (No. 794 date. 22 June 2004), Ukrhydroenergo transferred its shares and property under the management of National Joint-Stock Company “Energy Company of Ukraine”. On 30 July 2004, Energy Company of Ukraine issued an order (pursuant to the Cabinet of Ministers’ Resolution No. 794) to rename State Joint-Stock Company “Ukrhydroenergo” in line with applicable laws. As a result, the company was renamed to Open Joint-Stock Company “Ukrhydroenergo”. It consisted of the following branches: Cascade of Kyivska HPP and Kyivska PSP, Kanivska HPP, Kremenchutska HPP, Dniprodzerzhinska HPP, Dniprovska HPP, Kakhovska HPP, and Dnistrovska HPP.

2005 
On 23 September 2005, Energy Company of Ukraine issued Order No. 43 “On Approval of Amendments to the Charter of OJSC Ukrhydroenergo” to approve Regulations on the Directorate for the construction of Dnistrovska PSP.

2007 
In 2007, Ukrhydroenergo was recognised among Top 100 Best Global Companies for its facility reconstruction efforts at the Global Leaders Forum in New York, United States.

2011 
On 18 March 2011, the General Meeting of Shareholders of OJSC Ukrhydroenergo elected Ihor Syrota the chairman of the Board (CEO since July 2011). On 9 June 2011, the General Meeting of Shareholders adopted a decision to rename the company to Public Joint-Stock Company Ukrhydroenergo according to the Law of Ukraine on Joint-Stock Companies and approve relevant changes to the company's Charter.

2016 
In 2016, Ukrhydroenergo gained UAH 2.210 billion in net profit and paid UAH 1.757 billion to meet different budget commitments, three times as much as in 2015. In addition, the Company paid UAH 0.327 billion in dividends to the national budget.

2017 
During 2017, the Company continued the measures envisaged by Hydropower Development Programme 2026 approved by the Cabinet of Ministers of Ukraine (Order No. 552-r dd. 13 July 2016). In 2017, Ukrhydroenergo proceeded with the construction of Kanivska PSP, one of the company's short-term top-priority projects. Kanivska PSP would become the third pumped-storage plant of Ukrhydroenergo, after Kyivska PSP and Dnistrovska PSP. Design works are underway to build Kakhovska HPP No. 2. The Company carries out installation works as part of the second stage of the Dnistrovska PSP construction (power unit No. 4).

2018 
A specialist of Ukrhydroenergo received a young scientist award from the President of Ukraine. According to the Star of Quality, a national ranking of quality of goods and services, Private Joint-Stock Company Ukrhydroenergo was recognized the best enterprise of Ukraine in 2017. An international financial auditor provided an opinion on financial statements. Ihor Syrota was awarded the National Prize of Ukraine in the field of science and technology in 2017 for the work “Development of reverse hydropower units at Dnistrovska PSP to increase the efficiency of the United Energy Systems of Ukraine”. Kyiv Administrative Court of Appeals confirmed the compliance of the hydropower development programme with the Constitution of Ukraine.Ukrhydroenergo launched a voluntary health insurance program. The company began a large-scale reconstruction of Dniprovska HPP. Ukrhydroenergo introduces a Code of Corporate Ethics. Lands with energy-generating facilities were brought under the ownership and management of Cascade of Kyivska HPP and Kyivska PSP. Ukrhydroenergo continued comprehensive cardiovascular diagnostics of employees. Representatives of Ukrhydroenergo joined councils for the Dnieper and Dniester rivers. Ukrhydroenergo presented its Corporate Governance Code. Dnistrovska PSP started installation of a turbine stator at power unit No. 4.

2019 
Company have upgraded 71 out of 103 operating power units, using borrowings and own funds. These efforts have significantly enhanced their capacity and raised environmental standards of electricity generation. Ukrhydroenergo's plans are to complete the ongoing renovation by 2026 by fully upgrading fixed assets at all plants. In 2019 were made some important steps towards achieving this goal. One of them was the commissioning of power unit No. 2 at Kyivska PSP after reconstruction that increased its operating capacity by 5.8 MW. Moreover, the plant started works on power unit No. 6 and is preparing for the reconstruction of power unit No. 4. The equipment at Dniprovska HPP, Kanivska HPP, Kakhovska HPP, and Seredniodniprovska HPP is reconstructing.

Ukrhydroenergo is directing its utmost efforts to implement the construction of Dnistrovska PSP. Stage 1 of the plant consisting of three power units is in operation. The construction of power unit No. 4 is underway. With the launch of the last power unit (No. 7) and the achievement of the 2268 MW installed capacity in generator mode, Dnistrovska PSP will become the largest pumped storage plant in Europe and the sixth largest in the world by installed capacity.

Ukrhydroenergo continues to work on the implementation of its prospective plans - the construction of Kanivska PSP and Kakhovska HPP No. 2. In this context, the year of 2019 was marked by productive negotiations with potential investors and the resolution of certain technical issues.

2019 was a year of change for the company. One of the key transformations was a corporate governance reform. An effective independent supervisory board has been in place at Ukrhydroenergo, comprising experts with years of professional expertise.

On 1 July 2019, a new model of the electricity market was introduced in accordance with the Law On the Electricity Market approved back in 2017. Having started to work in the new market, the company has encountered a number of legal, economic, and technical issues that affect its financial performance. These include the need to sell 35% of the electricity generated by HPPs to Guaranteed Buyer state enterprise at a too low price, higher costs of electricity to fill water reservoirs of PSPs, no revenue from the provision of services for automatic and manual loadfrequency control, additional losses during synchronous compensator operation for voltage and reactive power control, etc.

Ukrhydroenergo introduced new formats designed to address environmental issues effectively. Company's professionalі experimentally tested the aeration method on power unit No. 6 at Kakhovska HPP by supplying compressed air in front of the turbine. Tests have shown that aeration is technically possible and gives good results.

2020 
The COVID-19 pandemic has changed the work of Ukraine’s largest hydropower company and was the biggest challenge of the past year. In response, Ukrhydroenergo promptly took measures to protect the health of employees and implemented new HR strategies to organize work remotely. Company avoided staff shortages and preserved all social payments.

In 2020 Ukrhydroenergo established a compliance service, whose work is aimed at ensuring that the company’s procedures comply with corporate governance standards, business ethics, integrity, social responsibility policy, regulatory requirements and current legislation.

In 2020, despite all the objective difficulties caused by the instability of the energy market and low water levels of rivers, Ukrhydroenergo fulfilled commitments and took another step towards the implementation of a crucial project enshrined in the Energy strategy of Ukraine 2035 - carried out commissioning operations on the unit №4 Dniester PSP. The construction, unprecedented in its scale, which involved hundreds of hydroelectric power engineers and contractors, did not stop for a moment during the year, which allowed to start up commissioning operations and test the mechanical part of the hydraulic unit.

Ukrhydroenergo promotes progress in the industry through the integration of leading technologies and solutions into electricity generation, attracting foreign experience for the modernization of hydropower facilities. In 2020, the company continued the previously taken course for the reconstruction of equipment as part of a large-scale rehabilitation program for existing hydropower plants. The ultimate goal is to improve the safety level of the power plants, increase their overall capacity, and extend the service life of HPPs and PSPs for at least another 50 years. In particular, in 2020, after reconstruction, hydroelectric unit No. 6 of the Kyivska PSP was put into industrial operation. After the reconstruction, its total installed capacity increased by 5.8 MW. The active campaign on technical re-equipment of the stations will contribute to the effective economic development of the Company and increase its investment attractiveness.

Ukrhydroenergo Electricity Output in 2019, million kWh

Strategic Development Plan 

The company's strategic goal is to supply the electricity to Ukraine's grid and secure the capacity reserve with water resources of the Dnieper and Dniester rivers. Ukrhydroenergo's strategic development plan is underpinned by Hydropower Development Programme 2026 approved by the Cabinet of Ministers of Ukraine on 13 July 2016 (Resolution No. 552-r), Ukraine Energy Strategy 2035, and the Strategy for Sustainable Development “Ukraine 2020” approved by the President of Ukraine (Decree No. 5/2015 dated 12 January 2015).

List of Ukrhydroenergo power plants

Ukrhydroenergo’s Key Investment Projects 
Ukrhydroenergo dedicates maximum efforts to implement measures under Ukraine Energy Strategy 2035 and Hydropower Development Programme 2026. With the new build and reconstruction of HPPs and PSPs, the company will boost the share of load-following capacity in the country's total energy mix to 16% by 2035. Higher share of hydropower resources in the energy sector will reduce the fuel consumption and the country's dependence on imports of fossil fuels, which, in turn, will strengthen Ukraine's energy selfsufficiency. In 2020, the company made capital investments of UAH 4.7 billion.

Stage 3 of Dnistrovska PSP (Power Units No. 5-7) 
Stage 3 includes the construction of three power units (no. 5–7) at Dnistrovska Pumped Storage Power Plant. The total capacity of units will make 972 MW in generator mode and 1,263 MW in pumping mode.

 2021-2026 project implementation period
 35,378 million UAH expected project cost
 21.2 % internal rate of return
 9.4 years discounted payback period
 6,223.87 million UAH positive value for money
 21,264 million UAH net present value

Construction of Kanivska PSP 
Objectives: increase the reliability and flexibility of the United Energy Systems of Ukraine and improve the frequency control; ensure that Ukraine meets the frequency and capacity control requirements for the integration of Ukraine's grid into the ENTSO-E; address the overload of base load plants (NPPs and TPPs) during peak hours; create the control reserve for connection of green generation facilities to the grid; create a mobile emergency reserve in the UES of Ukraine.

 2008-2028 project implementation period
42,166 million UAH (VAT incl.), including UAH 29,409 million in borrowings and UAH 12,757 million in own funds – total project cost
 9.52% internal rate of return
 1.38 profitability index
 18 years discounted payback period
 13,617 million UAH net present value
 25,470 million UAH positive value for money

Construction of Kakhovska HPP No. 2 
Objectives: increase the total capacity of Kakhovsky Hydropower Hub (Kakhovska HPP No. 1 + Kakhovska HPP No. 2) to 585 MW, which will help: Ukraine meet frequency and power control requirements for the integration of the domestic grid into the ENTSO-E, in particular, in the secondary and tertiary control ranges; ensure the stable operation of both HPPs in peak hours; increase the average long-term output through full utilisation of flood water; streamline the joint operation of Dniprovsky and Kakhovsky Hydropower Hubs; extend the service life of Kakhovska HPP No. 1 and the Hub as a whole.

 2018-2028 project implementation period
 18,121.4 million UAH (VAT incl.) total project cost
 7.3% internal rate of return
 19.5 years discounted payback period
 1.12 profitability index
 1.617 billion UAH net present value
 9.817 billion UAH positive value for money

Installation of Hybrid Power Generation Systems at JSC Ukrhydroenergo 
The installation of hybrid systems for electricity generation on the basis of joint work of hydroelectric units and energy storage systems will expand the range of additional services that the company provides to the Ukrainian Electricity Market: reserve for fast frequency support; automatic reserve of resuming and maintaining the frequency; reactive power/voltage regulation; restoration of the IPS of Ukraine after a systemic accident; expansion of the power control range from P0 to P min of hydraulic units.

Solar Photovoltaic Generation Systems will also be installed at these facilities as an alternative source of energy for the HPP's own needs and charging of energy storage systems. The project will support the integration of the IPS of Ukraine into the European Network Of Transmission System Operators (ENTSO-E) by increasing the flexibility of the system during its isolated operation to full synchronization when Ukraine finally joins the European Network and becomes part of it, as well as contribute to the process of integration of the renewed sources into the Ukrainian Energy System.

The project aims to increase the reliability and sustainability of the integrated power system (IPS) for integration into the ENTSO-E system by expanding the provision of ancillary services of PJSC «Ukrhydroenergo» for the electricity market and improving their quality (including speed and range), increased economic efficiency of the IPS of Ukraine by increasing the maneuvering capacity and reducing the cost of regulating the IPS in Ukraine.

Sources of financing: IBRD loan – USD 177 million. The loan of the Clean Technology Fund – USD 34 million, CTF grant – usd 1 million. The company's own funds amounted to US$38 million.

 2021-2024 project implementation period
 250,000 million USD total project cost
 212 MW the total capacity of storage systems for five HPPs - approximately
 64 MW photoelectric installations

Upgrade and Reconstruction Of HPPs And PSPs 
In 2020, the project of II stage reconstruction was financed by more than UAH 943 million of credit funds from the European Bank for Reconstruction and Development and the European Investment Bank.

Kyivska PSP 
In 2020, reconstruction was completed and hydroelectric generating unit No. 6 was put into industrial operation, and a set of measures was taken on hydroelectric generating unit No. 2 to bring it up to the project's characteristics. As a result, the capacity of Kyivska PSP increased by 10.6 MW in total. Reconstruction of hydroelectric unit No. 4 is also in progress, where additional work is expected to replace the stator iron. In addition, at the end of last year, the Automated Safety Monitoring System for the Kyivska PSP dam was put into trial operation. This completes a unique effort to ensure continuous automated state monitoring of dams and hydraulic structures at all operating PSPs.

Kanivska HPP 
At Kanivska HPP, a new block transformer with an increased capacity of 90 MBA of unit No. 4 has been put into operation, as the single capacity of each hydroelectric unit of that block increased by 3.5 MW. Overall, an active stage continues at Units 4 and 5 to complete a huge range of work. In parallel, state-of-the-art control and monitoring systems are being installed on this equipment, which will significantly improve the level of operation.

Kremenchutska HPP

At Kremenchutska HPP, in addition to the scheduled repairs that were carried out during the previous year, reconstruction of hydroelectric unit No. 4 began. The plant also installed a new automated firefighting system and commissioned an early detection and warning system for emergencies.

Seredniodniprovska HPP

In 2020, reconstruction of hydroelectric unit No. 2 at Seredniodniprovska HPP continued. Hydroelectric unit No. 1 was also taken out of operation for reconstruction. Besides, at the plant the upper section of gate 8 of the spillway dam was replaced, which increased the reliability of the hydraulic structure as a whole, and corrosion protection of metal structures of the 2 × 200t gantry crane was carried out.

Dniprovska HPP 
Hydropower unit No. 16 has been reconstructed and put into industrial operation. In addition, a huge amount of unique work has been performed at Dniprovska HPP, in particular, construction work to reinforce the foundation concrete. Moreover, equipment supply and reconstruction works are performed simultaneously on 3 hydroelectric units under the conditions of the operating plant.

Kakhovska HPP 
In 2020 at Kakhovska HPP 8 own needs switchboards and transformers were completely replaced with new and modern ones and L-68, L-69 154 kV horizontal bushings were reconstructed with the replacement of main and reserve line protections, cable and wire products, secondary switching circuits and a high frequency path of 154 kV. For hydroelectric units No. 1 and No. 2, two 70000 kVA unit power transformers were purchased and delivered. Important projects are also being implemented to improve hydraulic structure safety control systems and install an integrated physical protection system at Kakhovska HPP.

Dnistrovska HPP 
At the Dnistrovska HPP, reinforcement of the upper part of the clay core of the earth-rock dam has been completed through the installation of impervious curtains using the «wall-in-soil» method. This will make it possible to raise the water level in the upper reservoir of the Dniester reservoir to the level of the forced retaining level, and considering the floods and high waters that are typical for the region where the HPP is located, the operational safety of the hydroelectric complex will be improved as a whole.

International Cooperation 
The establishment of the Ukrainian-Moldovan Commission for the Sustainable Use and Protection of the Dniester Basin was a new stage in cross-border cooperation between Ukraine and Moldova. The Dniester Commission will contribute to finding effective solutions to environmental problems on both sides of the Dniester.

Cooperation with financial organisations and institutions is an important area of international activities to raise financial investments. Ukrhydroenergo cooperates with the International Bank for Reconstruction and Development, the European Bank for Reconstruction and Development, and the European Investment Bank under Ukrhydroenergo Hydropower Rehabilitation Project.

Environmental Responsibility 

Ukrhydroenergo is one of the main water users in Ukraine's water system and operates on the main rivers of the country, the Dnieper and the Dniester. This places great responsibility on the company for the use of water resources and the commitment to pay significant attention to environmental issues. Expenditures of Ukrhydroenergo on environmental protection in 2020 amounted to UAH 45.8 million, in particular, capital investments in environmental protection amounted to UAH 43.2 million, current expenditures – UAH 1.2 million, fees for operational environmental services – UAH 1.4 million. Rent for the use of water resources – UAH 143.1 million. Ukrhydroenergo seeks to minimise its impact on the environment at all stages of production cycles, use natural resources efficiently, and preserve the nature for future generations.

External links

  
  
 
 
 
 
 

 2018 Ukrhydroenergo Management Report Generating Energy of the Future (English)

 2019 Ukrhydroenergo Management Report Generating Energy of the Future (English)

 2020 Ukrhydroenergo Press Booklet Generating Energy of the Future (English)
Denys Shmyhal: Construction of the largest hydroelectric power plant in Europe is underway in Ukraine - Ukraine Government Portal (2021)
The launch of a new Dniester PSPS storage pump will allow Ukrhydroenergo to better fulfill its social obligations to provide the population of Ukraine with electricity, says Denys Shmyhal - Ukraine Government Portal (2021)
Ukraine’s Power Infrastructure Integration with the EU Power Grid to Benefit from World Bank Support - The World Bank (2021)
Ukraine state hydro producer targets capacity expansion as energy transition, ENTSO-E deadline loom - Independent Commodity Intelligence Services (2021) 

Electric power companies of Ukraine
State companies based in Kyiv Oblast
Hydroelectric power stations in Ukraine
Government-owned companies of Ukraine